The James Caldwell House, at 105 Colonial Dr. in Taylor County, Kentucky near Campbellsville, Kentucky, was built in 1854-55.  It was listed on the National Register of Historic Places in 2011.

It is Greek Revival in style, and was built by African American slaves during 1854-55.  It was renovated in 1989.

It is on a portion of a  property owned by settlers John and Elizabeth Fulton Caldwell, who came to the area in 1801.

References

National Register of Historic Places in Taylor County, Kentucky
Greek Revival houses in Kentucky
Houses completed in 1855
Houses on the National Register of Historic Places in Kentucky
1855 establishments in Kentucky